Plug, PLUG, plugs, or plugged may refer to:

 Plug (accounting), an unsupported adjustment to an accounting record 
 Plug (fishing), a family of fishing lures
 Plug (horticulture), a planting technique
 Plug (jewellery), a type of jewellery worn in stretched piercings
 Plug (sanitation), a stopper for a drainage outlet
 Butt plug, a sex toy that is inserted into the rectum
 Core plug, used to fill the casting holes on engines
 Earplug for ear protection
 Fusible plug, a safety device in steam boilers
 Hair plug, hair that has undergone hair transplantation
 Mating plug, secretion used in the mating of some animal species
 Plug, a step in the manufacturing process for parts made of carbon-fiber-reinforced polymer
 Plug, a type of chewing tobacco made by pressing tobacco with syrup
 Plug, the central element of a Plug and feathers, a tool for splitting stone
 Plug computer, a type of small-form-factor computer
 Portland Linux/Unix Group (PLUG), a group of Linux enthusiasts in Portland, Oregon
 Product plug, or product placement in marketing
 Volcanic plug, a geological landform
 Wall plug, a fastener that allows screws to be fitted into drywall or masonry walls
 Plug (plumbing)

Electrical
 Electrical connector, such as:
 AC power plugs and sockets, for alternating current (mains electricity)
 DC connector, for direct current (small equipment)
 A semiconductor plug, typically tungsten, is used to fill a via and connect different wiring levels on wafers
 Plug fuses, used in the United States until 1960

Media and entertainment
 Plug (The Bash Street Kids), a character from The Bash Street Kids comic strip in The Beano
 Plug (comics), a British comic that featured Plug from The Bash Street Kids
 Plug Plug, a Peruvian post-hardcore band
 Plugged!, a 1995 album by Vin Garbutt
 Plugged, a 1995 album by The Bobs
 Plugged, a film satirizing advertising, directed by Tim Russ
 Plugged (novel), a 2011 novel by Eoin Colfer
 Plugged (Starflyer 59 album), a 1996 album by Starflyer 59
 Song plugging, the promotion of songs to induce sales
 Plug (music), also called plugg, a subgenre of trap music

People

Ina Plug, South African archaeologist
 Plug, an alias of Luke Vibert (born 1973), British electronic musician

See also
 
 
 Plugg (disambiguation)
 Plug-in (disambiguation)
 Plug board (disambiguation)